Mariya Agapova (born April 7, 1997) is a Kazakhstani mixed martial artist. She currently competes in the flyweight division of the Ultimate Fighting Championship (UFC).

Background
Agapova started training martial arts around the age of eight in order to learn to defend herself. She graduated from college specializing in physical education for kids.

Mixed martial arts career

Early career
Agapova fought her early MMA career exclusively in Russia, China and Kazakhstan. She amassed an undefeated record of 6–0 prior to debuting on Dana White's Tuesday Night Contender Series.

Dana White's Tuesday Night Contender Series 
Agapova appeared at Dana White's Contender Series 22 on July 30, 2019, facing Tracy Cortez. She lost the fight via unanimous decision.

Invicta Fighting Championships 
Agapova made her Invicta Fighting Championships debut on September 6, 2019 against Alexa Conners at Invicta FC: Phoenix Series 2. She won the fight via a submission in round one.

Agapova next faced Marilia Santos on October 6, 2019 at Invicta FC 37: Gonzalez vs. Sanchez. She won the fight via technical knockout in round one. This win earned her the Performance of the Night award.

Agapova was scheduled to face Daiana Torquato on February 7, 2020 at Invicta FC 39: Frey vs. Cummins II. However, Agapova collided with a car when she was on her way to train at the ATT and had to withdraw from the bout.

Ultimate Fighting Championship 
Agapova signed with the UFC in February 2020. She  made her debut against Hannah Cifers on June 13, 2020 at UFC on ESPN: Eye vs. Calvillo. After dropping Cifers with a head kick, Agapova won the bout via first round submission. This win earned her the Performance of the Night award.

Agapova faced Shana Dobson on August 22, 2020 at UFC on ESPN 15. She lost the fight via second round TKO, coming on the receiving end of the largest betting odds upset in UFC women's history (tied with Holly Holm's upset victory over Ronda Rousey at UFC 193).

Agapova faced Sabina Mazo on October 9, 2021 at UFC Fight Night 194. She won the fight via rear-naked choke after knocking Mazo down in round three. This fight earned her the Performance of the Night award.

Agapova faced Maryna Moroz on March 5, 2022 at UFC 272. She lost the fight via a submission in round two.

Agapova was scheduled to face Ji Yeon Kim at UFC 277 on July 9, 2022.  However, Agapova was forced out of the fight due to knee injury and she was replaced by Joselyne Edwards.

Agapova faced Gillian Robertson, replacing Melissa Gatto,  on September 17, 2022 at UFC Fight Night 210. She lost the fight via rear-naked choke.

Championships and accomplishments

Mixed martial arts
Ultimate Fighting Championship
Performance of the Night (Two times) 
Invicta Fighting Championships
Performance of the Night (one time) vs. Marilia Santos

Mixed martial arts record

|-
|Loss
|align=center|10–4
|Gillian Robertson
|Technical Submission (rear-naked choke)
|UFC Fight Night: Sandhagen vs. Song 
|
|align=center|2
|align=center|2:19
|Las Vegas, Nevada, United States
|
|-
|Loss
|align=center|10–3
|Maryna Moroz
|Submission (arm-triangle choke)
|UFC 272
|
|align=center|2
|align=center|3:27
|Las Vegas, Nevada, United States
|
|-
|Win
|align=center|10–2
|Sabina Mazo
|Submission (rear-naked choke)
|UFC Fight Night: Dern vs. Rodriguez
|
|align=center|3
|align=center|0:53
|Las Vegas, Nevada, United States
|
|-
|Loss
|align=center|9–2
|Shana Dobson
|TKO (punches)
|UFC on ESPN: Munhoz vs. Edgar 
|
|align=center|2
|align=center|1:38
|Las Vegas, Nevada, United States
|
|-
|Win
|align=center|  9–1
|Hannah Cifers
|Submission (rear-naked choke)
|UFC on ESPN: Eye vs. Calvillo
|
|align=center| 1
|align=center| 2:42
|Las Vegas, Nevada, United States 
|
|-
|Win
|align=center|  8–1
|Marilia Santos
|TKO (elbows)
|Invicta FC 37: Gonzalez vs. Sanchez
|
|align=center| 1
|align=center| 4:55
|Kansas City, Kansas, United States  
|
|-
|Win
|align=center|  7–1
|Alexa Conners
|Submission (rear-naked choke)
|Invicta FC: Phoenix Series 2
|
|align=center| 1
|align=center| 3:03
|Kansas City, Kansas, United States 
|
|-
|Loss
|align=center| 6–1
|Tracy Cortez
|Decision (unanimous)
|Dana White's Contender Series 22
|
|align=center| 3
|align=center| 5:00
|Las Vegas, Nevada, United States
|
|-
|Win
|align=center| 6–0
|Na Liang
|TKO (punches)
|Heroine FC 2
|
|align=center| 1
|align=center| N/A
|Zhengzhou, China 
|
|-
|Win
|align=center| 5–0
|Liliya Kazak
|Decision (split)
|Fight Nights Global 82
|
|align=center| 3
|align=center| 5:00
|Moscow, Russia 
|
|-
|Win
|align=center| 4–0
|Yulia Kutsenko
|Submission (armbar)
|Fight Nights Global 72
|
|align=center| 3
|align=center| 3:47
|Sochi, Russia 
|
|-
|Win
|align=center| 3–0
|Yulia Litvinceva
|TKO (punches)
|Brave CF 6
|
|align=center| 1
|align=center| 2:15
|Almaty, Kazakhstan 
|
|-
|Win
|align=center| 2–0
|Dariya Kutuzova
|Submission (rear-naked choke)
|WFCA 28
|
|align=center| 1
|align=center| 2:45
|Pavlodar, Kazakhstan
|
|-
|Win
|align=center| 1–0
|Yuliya Ivanova
|Decision (unanimous)
|WFCA 8
|
|align=center| 3
|align=center| 5:00
|Pavlodar, Kazakhstan
|
|-

See also
 List of current UFC fighters
 List of female mixed martial artists

References

External links
 
 

1997 births
Living people
People from Pavlodar
Kazakhstani people of Russian descent
Kazakhstani female mixed martial artists
Kazakhstani expatriate sportspeople in the United States
Flyweight mixed martial artists
Ultimate Fighting Championship female fighters